Hebius sanguineus, the Cameron Highlands keelback, is a species of snake of the family Colubridae. The snake is found in Malaysia.

References 

sanguineus
Reptiles of Malaysia
Reptiles described in 1932